Earl of Inchiquin (or Earl of Inchquin) was launched at Swansea in 1764. She sailed between Cork and Swansea and then became a Portsmouth tender. The British Royal Navy hired her in 1776 or earlier. A French privateer captured her in the Channel in 1781. 

Missing volumes or missing pages in extant volumes of Lloyd's Register (LR) have resulted in her first appearing in Lloyd's Register in 1776, and in missing information for some subsequent years.

The Lieutenant commanding the British tender Earl of Inchiquin seized the snow  (or Dickinson), William Meston, master, on 7 April 1776 at King Road, off Avonmouth in the Bristol Channel. Dickinson had been on her way to Nantes when Dickinsons crew brought her into Bristol. She carried documents describing all the vessels the American rebels were sending to France.

The French privateer  captured Earl of Inchquin on 15 March 1781. The French privateers Bougainville (24 or 32 guns), and Tartare (12 guns), joined the chase. Unable to escape, Robertson struck.

Earl of Inchiquin was no longer listed in Lloyd's Register for 1782.

Citations

References
 
 
 

1764 ships
Age of Sail merchant ships of England
Hired armed vessels of the Royal Navy
Captured ships